Vikram Dhillon is an Indo-Canadian Feature Film Producer, Director, Actor and a former VJ for Channel V (Star TV  India)

Biography

Career
Vikram Dhillon is a Co-Founder of the newly formed Digital Content Studio The Foundry with his partner Puneet Sira. He is producing a slate of original IP projects with studios, OTT platforms and channels.

Dhillon directed a Punjabi feature film titled Pinky Moge Wali starring Neeru Bajwa, Geeta Zaildar and Gavie Chahal for which Dhillon was nominated for Best Director.

He has also Produced the web series The Great Punjabi Luv Shuv Story for Ekta Kapoor's digital channel AltBalaji under his Eyeline Entertainment banner, including the feature film Ji Karda Directed and Produced by Dhillon.

Vikram Dhillon began his career as a VJ for Rupert Murdoch’s Channel V (Star TV) where he hosted the shows [V] Challenge, Cool Maal and Late Night V.  Dhillon went on to produce and direct series for the channel such as The Chair, Chat Room and Cool Maal.

The feature film documentary Bollywood Bound (2003) (Canadian National Film Board) followed the lives of Vikram Dhillon, Vekeana Dhillon, Neeru Bajwa and Ruby Bhatia as Indo-Canadians in Bollywood. The film premiered at the Palm Springs International Film Festival in 2003.

Dhillon continued his work as a producer with Jataka Tales for Japanese television, Sanatta, a horror series, I Like an interview based series for B4U Music. He went on to produce a talk show called Take One for Geo TV in Dubai.

Dhillon has directed a series of commercials for the Society Magazine which he also produced. Dhillon produced and directed Music Videos for bands such as Mantra, and Signia.  Independently, he’s produced and directed Corporate Videos and AVs for Idea Cellular, Magna Publishing Co. and Consulate General of Canada (Mumbai).

Dhillon produced and directed a short documentary film, Mogaveera, for the Vyavasthaphaka Mandali (Mumbai).

Personal life
Dhillon's sister Vekeana Dhillon is a content creator, screen writer and actress, who has written Vikram's Pinky Moge Wali and Ji Karda, and Puneet Sira’s I - Proud To Be An Indian, Jai Veeru and Kisaan.

Dhillon is the son of the retired Environmental Health Officer Mr. Dyal Singh Dhillon and Harcharan Kaur Dhillon, who wrote the lyrics to the song "Khyalan Wich" which was featured in I - Proud To Be An Indian (2004).

Filmography

References

External links
 

1973 births
Canadian male actors of Indian descent
Living people
American people of Punjabi descent
Date of birth missing (living people)
Punjabi-language film directors